Todd Kelly (born 9 October 1979) is a retired Australian professional racing driver who competed in the Virgin Australia Supercars Championship. He is the older brother of fellow Supercars driver and former Bathurst 1000 winner, Rick Kelly.  He drove for the Holden Racing Team from 2003 until 2007, and Perkins Engineering in 2008. Since 2009, he has been with his family team Kelly Racing (now known as Kelly Grove Racing). He is the youngest driver to have reached 100 starts in the series.

Supercars Championship
Season 2001 was Kelly's first full-time season in V8 Supercars (although he had previously raced in the category in 99' and 00'), he drove for the K-Mart Racing Team alongside Greg Murphy.  He and Greg finished 3rd at Bathurst. He finished his first full season in 6th and broke through for his first-round victory in the last round of the season at Sandown Raceway. Season 2002 saw him take four second places, and fifth in the championship.

After two successful years with K-Mart Racing Team, the departure of Jason Bright left a vacancy at the Holden Racing Team in 2003. Kelly and new team-mate Mark Skaife won the Sandown 500 in very wet conditions and in controversial circumstances with a late race tussle with the Team Dynamik Commodore of Jason Richards and Simon Wills. Kelly finished ninth in the championship, behind his brother Rick in eighth.  Kelly was part of the two-car Holden Monaro assault by Garry Rogers Motorsport on the 2003 Bathurst 24 Hour race. With co-drivers Jason Bright, Greg Murphy and Peter Brock, Kelly won the race with Murphy crossing the line only 0.3505 seconds ahead of the teams lead car (and the 2002 race winner) driven by Garth Tander and co-driven by Steven Richards, Cameron McConville and Nathan Pretty.

Season 2004 saw him finish behind his brother in the Championship, but this time two places up in seventh. Season 2005 was Kelly's most successful year in V8 Supercars, claiming five podiums. Three of them were wins, including the Bathurst 1000 with Mark Skaife which was Todd's 26th birthday and also the V8 Supercars China Round, the series' only ever event to be held in China. He finished 4th in the standings, ahead of teammate Skaife in fifth.

Kelly's 2006 season was fairly average throughout the first six rounds, albeit largely through mechanical failures, however after strong driving performances at the next three rounds including second in both the Sandown 500 and Bathurst 1000 when he paired up with younger brother Rick Kelly. Kelly's seat was taken by HSV Dealer Team driver Garth Tander.  He was just starting to show some of the form that had him finish fourth in the championship in 2005. He finished the year off strongly, with a second and first place in the last two rounds which left him in sixth place at the end of the year.

Season 2007 was another average year for Kelly, he won the Clipsal 500 but was not able to continue that edge. He came second at Phillip Island and at the Grand Finale, finishing seventh in the championship. In doing so, helped secure Garth Tander the driver's championship. At the conclusion of the season, Kelly announced he would drive for Jack Daniel's Racing from 2008 onwards after a five-year association with HRT. This move is believed to have also been supported by 2007 champion Garth Tander confirming he will be moving from HSVDT to HRT.

Kelly's 2008 proved to be inconsistent. After starting the year well at Clipsal, where he finished fifth for the round, the middle part of the season saw a lack of the results expected from Kelly. After a major suspension geometry issue was resolved during the course of the Bathurst weekend, the car showed a sudden turn of speed. He finished 4th at Surfers Paradise, then scored a stunning race win in the wet at Symmons Plains, the first victory of any kind (race or round) for a Perkins Engineering entry since 2006. Kelly finished the season in 12th position.

Career results

Supercars Championship results
(Races in bold indicate pole position) (Races in italics indicate fastest lap)

Bathurst 1000 results

Bathurst 24 Hour results

References

External links

 Official Todd Kelly Website
 Todd Kelly Kelly Racing Profile
 Todd Kelly Holden Motor Sport Profile
 Todd Kelly V8 Supercars Official Profile

1979 births
Bathurst 1000 winners
Formula Ford drivers
Formula Holden drivers
Living people
People from Mildura
Racing drivers from Victoria (Australia)
Supercars Championship drivers
Kelly Racing drivers
Nismo drivers
Garry Rogers Motorsport drivers